Lust for Blood may refer to:

"Lust for Blood", a song by Gackt from their 2003 album Crescent
"Lust for Blood", a song by Powerwolf from their 2013 album Preachers Of The Night
Lust for Blood (album), a 2006 album by Velvet Acid Christ

See also
Bloodlust (disambiguation)
Blood fetishism, a usually pathological desire related to blood